Ibrahim Nasrallah (2 December 1954), the winner of the Arabic Booker Prize (2018),   was born in 1954 to Palestinian parents who were evicted from their land in Al-Burayj, Palestine in 1948. He spent his childhood and youth in a refugee camp in Jordan, and began his career as a teacher in Saudi Arabia. After returning to Amman, he worked in the media and cultural sectors till 2006 when he dedicated his life to writing. To date, he has published 15 poetry collections, 22 novels, and several other books. In 1985, he started writing the Palestinian Comedy covering 250 years of modern Palestinian history in a series of novels in which each novel is an independent one; to date 13 novels have been published in the framework of this project. Five of his novels and a volume of poetry have been published in English, nine in Persian, four works in Italian, two in Spanish, and one novel in Danish and Turkish. 

Nasrallah is also an artist and photographer and has had four solo exhibitions of his photography. He won nine prizes, and his novel Prairies of Fever was chosen by the Guardian newspaper as one of the most important ten novels written by Arabs or non-Arabs about the Arab world. Three of his novels were listed on the International Prize for Arabic Fiction for the years 2009, 2013, and 2014. In 2012 he won the inaugural Jerusalem Award for Culture and Creativity for his literary work. His books are considered one of the most influential and best seller Arabic books, as new editions are released frequently and many young readers are attracted to his books.

In January 2014, he succeeded in summiting Mount Kilimanjaro in a venture that involved two Palestinian adolescents, a boy and a girl, who have lost their legs. The climb was in support to a nongovernmental organization dedicated to providing medical services to Palestinian and Arab children. Nasrallah wrote about this journey in a novel entitled The Spirits of Kilimanjaro (2015). In 2016, Nasrallah was awarded the Katara Prize for Arabic Novels for this work.

His novel The Second Dog War was awarded the International Prize for Arabic Fiction (Arabic Booker) for 2018. 
In 2020 he became the first Arabic writer to be awarded the "Katara Prize" for Arabic Novels for the second time for his novel "A Tank Under the Christmas Tree".

Poetry
 Love is Wicked, 2017.
 A Ray of Light Between Two Nights, 2012.
 If I were a maestro, 2009
 Flute Chamber, 2007
 Mirrors of Angels, 2001
 In the Name of the Mother and the Son, 1999. (Arab Scientific Publishers, 128 pages, 2010)
 The Book of Death and the Dead, 1998
 Verandahs of Autumn, 1997.
 Volume of Poetic Collection (1980-1993), 1994
 The Fox’s Scandal, 1993 (Published in English).
 Green Wood, 1991
 Storms of the Heart, 1989
 The River Boy and the General, 1987
 The Last Dialogue a Few Minutes Before the Killing of the Sparrow, 1984
 No’man Recovers His Color, 1984
 Morning Songs, 1984
 The Rain Inside, 1982 (Curbstone Books, 126 pages, 2009)
 Horses are Overlooking the City, 1980

Novels

 Prairies of Fever, Arabic edition 1985; English edition by Interlink 1993, Italian edition by Edizioni Lavoro 2001, Hebrow edition by Hed Arzi in 2001, and  Danish edition by Underskoven in 2006
 Terrestrial Waves, 1988
 The Barking Dog (Aw), 1990
 Just the Two of Us, Arabic edition 1992, Italian edition by Ilisso under the title Dentro la notte 2004, and English edition under the title Inside the Night  by The American University in Cairo Press, 2007
 The Guard of the Lost city, 1998
 Balcony of Delirium, 2005
 Balcony of Snow Man 2009
 Balcony of Disgrace 2010
 Balcony of Abyss 2013
 Balcony of Paradise 2014
 The Second Dog War 2016
 "Short Story Writer's Tragedy" 2021

Palestinian comedy covering 250 years of modern Palestinian history (12 novels) 
 Birds of Caution, 1996.
 Eraser Child, 2000.
 Olive Trees of the Streets, 2002.
 Safe Weddings, 2004. (Arab Scientific Publishers, 2009)
 Under the Midmorning Sun, 2004. (English , Arab Scientific Publishers, 2009)
 Time of White Horses, 2007. Shortlisted for the International Prize for Arabic Fiction, Nancy Roberts (translator), American University in Cairo Press (Publisher), 512 pages
 Lanterns of The King of Galilee, 2012.
 Spirits of Kilimanjaro, 2015.  4 Arabic editions.
 Bells Trilogy: Keys' Shadows, An Autobiography of an Eye, A Tank Under the Christmas Tree, 2019.
 My Childhood So Far, 2022

Nasrallah has also written poetry for children in two collections:
 Good Morning Children, 1983.
 Good Things Called Home, 1984.

As a writer and editor he has also published literary works about other Arab writers and poets which include:
 The Book of Writing: That is Life…That is Color (Testimonies about Writing), . Author. 2018
 The Flying Autobiography; Less than an Enemy. More than a Friend. Author. 2006
 The Defeat of the Victors: The Cinema between Creativity and Market Demand. Author. 2000
 Portraits of Being: Cinematic Reflections, 2010.. Author. 2000
 The Art and the Artist: Jabra Ibrahim Jabra’s writings about fine art  (editor) 2000.
 The Complete Poetry Collection of The Palestinian Poet Ahmad Hilmi Abdul-Baqui, (Researcher and Editor), 2002.

Nasrallah is a regular contributor to several to the main newspapers in the Arab world. 
He is also a painter and photographer.  He has contributed to several exhibitions and had his own photography shows entitled The Autobiography of an Eye in 1996, and Under Two Suns: Images and Words in 2004, The Life of the Dead Sea a participation at the fifth Gwangju Biennale – South Korea 2004.
Many academic theses handled his poetry and novels. The following dealt exclusively with his works:
Nasrallah also had poetry reading at several cultural centers in metropolitan cities such as Paris, Rome, Venice, Frankfurt, Berlin, and cities in England Denmark, Switzerland and the United States of America ...., not to mention numerous literary activities in almost all Arabic capitals. Nasrallah also gave lectures and poetry readings at many of the local Jordanian universities as well Arabs and European universities. His work has attracted attention among critics and international academia with 10 literary critic books, 15 PhD thesis, and around 45 Maters thesis studying his work.

Awards
 In April 2018, he won the International Prize for Arabic Fiction award for The Second War of the Dog.
 In 2020 he won the Katara Prize for Arabic Novels for the second time, for his novel A Tank Under the Christmas Tree.
 In 2018 he won the International Prize for Arabic Fiction for his novel The Second Dog War.
 In 2016, he won the Katara Prize for Arabic Novels for his novel The Spirits of Kilimanjaro.
 In 2012 he won the inaugural (Jerusalem Award for Culture and Creativity) for his literary work.     
 The prestigious Sultan Owais Literary Award for Poetry in 1997, a prize for Arab language poets.
 Three awards from the Jordanian Writers Association for the best volume of poetry.
 The Tayseer Sbool prize for his novels in 1994.
 The Arar literary Award, for Jordanian and Arab poets, Jordan, 1991.

Political persecution
In June 2006, Nasrallah's fourth collection of poetry Nu’man Yastariddu Lawnahu (Anemone Regains Its Colour) first published in 1984, was suddenly banned in Jordan, while Nasrallah faced charges of insulting the state, inciting dissension and reporting inaccurate information to future generations.

In an interview with The Guardian, Nasrallah commented on the charges he was facing by saying: "I was completely shocked,I did not know how to respond. All I could think of at that moment was that I needed to finish the book I was working on before things got worse. But I was unable to continue writing. I was confused and angry and also afraid."

References

1954 births
Living people
People from Amman
20th-century Palestinian poets
21st-century Jordanian poets
Jordanian people of Palestinian descent
21st-century Palestinian poets
Palestinian male poets
20th-century male writers
21st-century male writers
20th-century Jordanian poets
International Prize for Arabic Fiction winners